Herbie Ziskend is an American political advisor and a deputy director of communications for the Biden administration since August 2022. He has previously served as a communications advisor for Vice President Kamala Harris from 2021 to 2022, and as a policy and communications advisor to Vice President Joe Biden from 2009 to 2011.

Education 
Ziskend earned a Bachelor of Arts from Cornell University and is a Dubin Scholar at the Harvard Kennedy School of Government.

Career

Obama administration 
Ziskend was a campaign staffer on the Barack Obama 2008 presidential campaign and later served as a policy and communications advisor to Vice President Joe Biden from 2009 to 2011.

During the 2008 presidential campaign, Ziskend, Eric Lesser and Arun Chaudhary organized a seder during the campaign. The tradition followed the Obama administration into the White House as the official White House Passover Seder 

After leaving the White House, Ziskend worked as Chief of Staff to Arianna Huffington at the Huffington Post Media Group in New York City, and as the Director of Public Policy and Rise of Rest Investments at Revolution LLC, an investment firm led by AOL co-founder Steve Case. Ziskend also worked as a senior vice president at SKDKnickerbocker.

References

Date of birth missing (living people)
Living people
Cornell University alumni
Year of birth missing (living people)
Harvard Kennedy School alumni
Joe Biden 2020 presidential campaign
Biden administration personnel
Obama administration personnel
Barack Obama 2008 presidential campaign
HuffPost
Jewish American government officials